Dennis Owchar (born March 28, 1953) is a Canadian retired professional ice hockey player who played 288 games in the National Hockey League. He was born in Dryden, Ontario, but grew up in Thunder Bay, Ontario. He played with the Pittsburgh Penguins and Colorado Rockies.

Career statistics

Regular season and playoffs

References

External links
 

1953 births
Living people
Canadian ice hockey defencemen
Colorado Rockies (NHL) players
Hershey Bears players
Houston Aeros draft picks
Ice hockey people from Ontario
New Haven Nighthawks players
People from Dryden, Ontario
Pittsburgh Penguins draft picks
Pittsburgh Penguins players
St. Catharines Black Hawks players
Sportspeople from Thunder Bay
Toronto Marlboros players